Viola stipularis, is a species of violet that grows in southern Central America, some Caribbean islands and northern South America; from Costa Rica and Guadeloupe south to Peru.

Description 

Herb 20–30 cm tall, spreading by creeping rhizomes. Petioles up to 8 mm long, surrounded by fringed triangular stipules up to 2 cm long. Leaves elliptic to lanceolate-elliptic, up to 9.5 cm long and 3.4 cm wide, margin serrate or crenate, sometimes dentate, apex acuminate, base cuneate. Flowers with thin pedicels up to 6 cm long, petals pinkish, lavender or bluish-white, blue-veined; lower petal obovate, the upper ones oblong-ovate or oblong-elliptic; up to 9 mm long and 4.5 mm wide; all petals with rounded apex; spur ca 1 mm long; anthers and ovary about almost 2 cm long.  Fruit, an ellipsoid capsule 6–7 mm long containing seeds ca 1 mm long.

Distribution and habitat 
Costa Rica, Panama, Lesser Antilles and northern South America south to Peru, in forested hills and montane forests between (150-) 840–3400 m.

Ecology 
V. stipularis can be found in open areas or near summits. It is a colonizer of disturbed habitats such as volcanic debris, and natural or human-caused landslides.

References 

Flora of Peru
stipularis
Flora of Ecuador
Flora of Venezuela
Flora of Costa Rica
Flora of Colombia
Flora of Panama
Flora of Guadeloupe
Flora of Martinique
Flora of Dominica
Taxa named by Olof Swartz